In enzymology, a glyceraldehyde-3-phosphate dehydrogenase (phosphorylating) is an enzyme that catalyzes the chemical reaction

D-glyceraldehyde 3-phosphate + phosphate + NAD+  3-phospho-D-glyceroyl phosphate + NADH + H+

The 3 substrates of this enzyme are D-glyceraldehyde 3-phosphate, phosphate, and NAD+, whereas its 3 products are 3-phospho-D-glyceroyl phosphate, NADH, and H+. This enzyme participates in glycolysis / gluconeogenesis.

Nomenclature 

This enzyme belongs to the family of oxidoreductases, specifically those acting on the aldehyde or oxo group of donor with NAD+ or NADP+ as acceptor.  The systematic name of this enzyme class is D-glyceraldehyde-3-phosphate:NAD+ oxidoreductase (phosphorylating). Other names in common use include triosephosphate dehydrogenase, dehydrogenase, glyceraldehyde phosphate, phosphoglyceraldehyde dehydrogenase, 3-phosphoglyceraldehyde dehydrogenase, NAD+-dependent glyceraldehyde phosphate dehydrogenase, glyceraldehyde phosphate dehydrogenase (NAD+), glyceraldehyde-3-phosphate dehydrogenase (NAD+), NADH-glyceraldehyde phosphate dehydrogenase, and glyceraldehyde-3-P-dehydrogenase.

References

Further reading 

 
 
 
 
 

EC 1.2.1
NADH-dependent enzymes
Enzymes of known structure